A luthier is someone who makes or repairs lutes and other string instruments.

Luthier may also refer to:

Luthier (horse), a French thoroughbred racehorse
Les Luthiers, an Argentine comedy-musical group
 Les Luthiers, Grandes Hitos, greatest hits show
 Les Luthiers (volumen 3), comedy album
 Les Luthiers (volumen 4), comedy album
 Les Luthiers (volumen 7), comedy album
Luthier, the older brother of Dyute and the playable character from Fire Emblem Gaiden